Acinetobacter radioresistens is a species of radiation-resistant bacteria. It is Gram-negative, oxidase-negative, not spore-forming, nonmotile, nonfermentative, aerobic, pleomorphic, and coccobacilli-shaped. The type strain of this species is strain FO-1 (= IAM 13186).

References

Further reading

External links
LPSN

Moraxellaceae
Bacteria described in 1988